Stepan Aleksandrovich Ryabokon (born 22 April 1993) is a Russian professional football player.

Club career
He made his Russian Football National League debut for FC Rotor Volgograd on 3 November 2010 in a game against FC Kuban Krasnodar.

External links
 
 

1993 births
People from Stavropol Krai
Living people
Russian footballers
Russia youth international footballers
Association football defenders
FC Rotor Volgograd players
FC Energiya Volzhsky players
FC Olimpia Volgograd players
FC SKA Rostov-on-Don players
PFC CSKA Moscow players
Sportspeople from Stavropol Krai